Nikos Nicolaou may refer to:

Nikos Nikolaou, Greek sculptor
Nikos Nikolaou (rower), Greek Olympic rower
Nikos Nicolaou (footballer, born 1973), Cypriot footballer for Anorthosis Famagusta and Nea Salamis
Nikos Nicolaou (footballer, born 1978), Cypriot footballer for Nea Salamis